Henry Langley (26 November 1836 – 1907) was a Canadian architect based in Toronto. He was active from 1854 to 1907. Among the first architects born and trained in Canada, he was a founding members of the Royal Canadian Academy of Arts in 1880 and was instrumental in establishing the Ontario Association of Architects in 1889. A conservative in architectural design, he is primarily known for designing numerous churches in the Toronto area, although he designed many secular buildings as well including residential, commercial and public buildings. Langley designed 70 churches throughout Ontario. He was the first chair of the Department of Architecture at the University of Toronto, where he taught during the 1880s and 1890s.

Life and career
Langley's parents, William Langley and Esther Anderson, emigrated to Canada from Ireland in 1832. Born in Toronto, Langley received his general education from the Toronto Academy where part of his training included studying the principles of drawing. In early 1854 he became apprenticed to Scottish architect William Hay, who was a specialist in gothic architecture. During his seven-year apprenticeship, he worked with Hay on some of the oldest buildings and structures in Toronto, including St. Basil's Church, Toronto (1855–1856), two of the original buildings at the University of St. Michael's College (1856), Yorkville Town Hall (1859-1860) and the Oaklands at De La Salle College (1860) among other structures.

After Hay's departure from Toronto in 1861, Langley was invited in 1862 by Hay's partner, Thomas Gundry, to become his new partner. He accepted and quickly became the firm's primary designer with Gundry shouldering most of the business side of the company. His most important project during these years was the Government House (1857–1859). In 1869 Gundry died, after which Langley spent the next four years working alone. However, he was assisted during those years by two talented apprentices who later became well known architects in Toronto: Frank Darling and his nephew Edmund Burke.

With the success of the firm, Langley brought in Burke and his brother, the builder Edward Langley, as partners in 1873. The company was in high demand and greatly increased its staff over the next several years. His brother left a decade later and Burke departed in 1894. His son, architect Charles Edward Langley, worked with him during the last 14 years of his life. Charles was the first person to graduate from the Department of Architecture at the University of Toronto on 3 May 1892.

Langley died in Toronto in 1907 and is interred at the Toronto Necropolis. He notably designed that cemetery's chapel.

Selected works

Gundry & Langley (1862-1869)

 St. Peter's Anglican Church, 1864–65
 Alexander Street Baptist Church, 1866, Demolished
 St. Patrick's Roman Catholic Church, 1869–70, now Our Lady of Mount Carmel Catholic Church

Langley (1869-1874)

 McGill Square Church, 1870–72, now Metropolitan United Church
 Parliament Street Methodist Church, 1871, Demolished
 Toronto Necropolis Chapel, 1872
 George Street Methodist Church, Peterborough, Ontario, 1874–75

Langley, Langley & Burke (1874-1884)
Henry Langley, Edward Langley & Edmund Burke

 Jarvis Street Baptist Church, 1874–75
 The Cathedral Church of St. James, spire, 1874
 Sherbourne Street Methodist Church, 1876, now St. Luke's United Church
 St. Andrew's Presbyterian Church, 1877–78, now Grace Toronto Church
 Elm Street Methodist Church, 1877, Demolished
 Little Trinity Anglican Church, addition, 1878
 St. Mark's Anglican Church, 1881

Langley & Burke (1884-1894)
Henry Langley & Edmund Burke

 Beverley Street Baptist Church, 1886, now Chinese Baptist Church
 Trinity Methodist Church, 1887–89, now Trinity St. Paul's United Church
 College Street Baptist Church, 1888, now Portuguese Seventh-Day Adventist Church
 Dunn Avenue Methodist Church, 1889, Demolished
 Walmer Road Baptist Church, 1889–92
 Jarvis Street Baptist Church, 1875

Langley & Langley (1894-1907)
Henry Langley & Charles Edward Langley

 Memorial Baptist Church, 1897

References

External links
Architects of Our City, Henry Langley, at Heritage Oshawa
Biography of Henry Langley, at Dictionary of Canadian Biography

1836 births
1907 deaths
19th-century Canadian architects
Academic staff of the University of Toronto
20th-century Canadian architects
People from Old Toronto
Canadian people of Irish descent
Members of the Royal Canadian Academy of Arts